The men's 50 metre backstroke competition at the 2022 Mediterranean Games was held on 3 July 2022 at the Aquatic Center of the Olympic Complex in Bir El Djir.

Records
Prior to this competition, the existing world and Mediterranean Games records were as follows:

Results

Heats
The heats were started at 10:54.

Final 
The final was held at 18:19.

References

Men's 50 metre backstroke